Wightman is an unincorporated community in Calhoun County, Iowa, in the United States. It has a population of less than 500 individuals.

History
Wightman was platted in 1903 when the Chicago Great Western Railroad was extended to that point. It was named for one of its founders, R. C. Wight.

Wightman's population was 35 in 1925.

References

Unincorporated communities in Calhoun County, Iowa
Unincorporated communities in Iowa